John Michael Allaby is an Aventis Junior prize-winning author. He was born on 18 September 1933 in Belper, Derbyshire in England.

He was a police cadet from 1949 to 1951. After that he served in the RAF from 1951 to 1954, becoming a pilot. After leaving the RAF, he worked as an actor from 1954 to 1964, including "The Keys of Marinus" Doctor Who storyline. He married Marthe McGregor on 3 January 1957.

From 1964 to 1972, he a worked as an editor for the Soil Association in Suffolk, England, editing Span  magazine from 1967 to 1972. He was a member of the board of directors for Ecosystems Ltd. in Wadebridge, Cornwall, England and was an associate editor of Ecologist from 1970 to 1972. He became a managing editor in 1972. In 1973, he became a freelance writer.

He has written widely about science, particularly about ecology and weather. He edits and writes dictionaries and encyclopaedias for Macmillan Publishers and Oxford University Press.  He co-authored James Lovelock's first two books: The Greening of Mars (1984, Warner Books) and Great Extinction (1983, Doubleday). His book, The Food Chain (André Deutsch) was runner-up for the Times Educational Supplement Information Book Award in 1984. The New York Public Library chose Dangerous Weather: Hurricanes as one of its books for the teenage in 1998. He won the Aventis Junior Prize for Science Books in 2001 for How the Weather Works. He is a member of the Society for the History of Natural History, the Planetary Society, the Society of Authors, the New York Academy of Sciences, and the Association of British Science Writers.

References
Contemporary Authors Online, Gale, 2008. Reproduced in Biography Resource Center. Farmington Hills, Mich.: Gale, 2008. Document Number: H1000001310. Online 29 July 2008.

External links
 Michael Allaby's Web site
 

English science writers
English magazine editors
English lexicographers
1933 births
Living people
English encyclopedists